Gabriel Nicolás Juárez Verón (born 7 December 1990) is an Argentine road cyclist, who currently rides for UCI Continental team .

Major results
2011
 1st  Road race, National Under-23 Road Championships
2012
 1st  Young rider classification Tour de San Luis
 5th Road race, National Road Championships
2013
 1st  Road race, National Road Championships
 1st Stage 3 (TTT) Vuelta a Bolivia
2014
 3rd Road race, National Road Championships

References

External links

1990 births
Living people
Argentine male cyclists
Sportspeople from La Rioja Province, Argentina